After All is an album by Luciano.

Track listing 
 Shake It Up Tonight
 Baby I can't Believe
 Hold On To Your Dreams
 All I'm Living For
 I'm Stepping On It
 True Love
 It's A Jungle Out There
 After All
 Try and Remember
 Took Me For Granted
 Hold Me In Your Arms
 Try and Remember (Remix)

References

1995 albums
Luciano (singer) albums